Adam Shapiro is the name of:

Adam Shapiro (activist) (born 1972), American co-founder of the International Solidarity Movement (ISM)
Adam Shapiro (television reporter), American television reporter and investigative journalist
Adam Shapiro, American actor in The Den (2013 film)
Adam Shapiro, American film producer of Incubus (2006 film)

See also 
 Shapiro